Barbara Jordan is an Austrian para-alpine skier.  She represented Austria in alpine skiing at the 1992 Winter Paralympics held in Tignes and Albertville, France. She won two silver medals and one bronze medal in LW3,4,9-classification events.

References

External links 
 

Living people
Year of birth missing (living people)
Place of birth missing (living people)
Paralympic alpine skiers of Austria
Austrian female alpine skiers
Alpine skiers at the 1992 Winter Paralympics
Medalists at the 1992 Winter Paralympics
Paralympic silver medalists for Austria
Paralympic bronze medalists for Austria
Paralympic medalists in alpine skiing